Lantern Hill is a 1990 television film written and directed by filmmaker Kevin Sullivan and based L.M. Montgomery's novel Jane of Lantern Hill. The film was co-produced by Sullivan Entertainment, the Disney Channel and CBC Television.

For the production of the film, Lantern Hill was filmed using the same house used for Sullivan's earlier production, Anne of Green Gables, though painted orange.  Many of the actors and actresses from Anne of Green Gables, Anne of Green Gables: The Sequel, and Road to Avonlea made appearances in this film.

Synopsis
12 year old Jane Stuart (Mairon Bennett) has long been told by her Grandmother Kennedy (Zoe Caldwell) that her father is dead. When her mother, Robin Stuart (Patricia Phillips) returns home after recovering from a long illness, Jane learns that her mysterious father, Andrew Stuart (Sam Waterston) is still alive. When Jane finally meets her father and travels with him to Prince Edward Island to stay at Lantern Hill, their family home, she discovers that he is a kind man that cares deeply for both her and her mother. Determined to reunite her parents, Jane enlists the aid of Hepzibah (Colleen Dewhurst), a powerful mystic, to help her solve an old mystery that has torn apart her family.
In a subplot, Jody Turner (Sarah Polley) is an abused servant girl who lives next door to Jane. They become best friends. Jody follows Jane on her journey and winds up working hard labor for several different people. Jane and Hepzibah convince Hepzibah's sisters to adopt Jody, which they oppose to at first because they want a boy. Later on they agree to adopt Jody {It's inferred that Hepzibah somehow made them change their minds.} Later on, Hepzibah dies with Jane and Jody by her side.

Cast 
Jane Stuart – Mairon Bennett
Andrew Stuart – Sam Waterston
Robin Stuart – Patricia Phillips
Mrs. Kennedy – Zoe Caldwell
Jody – Sarah Polley
Hepzibah – Colleen Dewhurst
Aunt Irene – Vivian Reis
Violet Titus – Joyce Campion
Justina Titus – Florence Paterson
Lillian Morrow – Sharry Flett
Evelyn Morror – Glori Gage
Aggie – Dora Dainton
William Kennedy – Robert Benson
Phyllis Kennedy – Juno Mills Cockell
Gertrude Kennedy – Jillian Cook
Frank Price – James Mainprize
Mary Price – Judy Sinclair
Cook - Valerie Boyle
Superintendent - Durward Allen
Mrs. Stanley - Esther Hockin
Anne Farquhar - Cecily Stanley
Agnes Ripley - Alyson Court
Schoolgirl - Dorion Davis
Mrs. Simpson - Denise Fergusson
Charlotte Simpson - Ellen Dubin
Little Schoolgirl - Gillian Steeve
Poultry Boy - Noam Zylberman
Owen Meade - Gareth Bennett
Jimmy-John Meade - Zachary Bennett
Dr. Arnett - Dan MacDonald
Milkman - Paul Coeur
Train Conductor - Jack Mather
Train Cook - Jason St. Amour

List of Awards
 Heartland Film Festival – Crystal Heart Award, 1992
 2 Gemini Awards: 
 Best Supporting Actress (Sarah Polley), 1991
 Best Costume Design (Martha Mann), 1991
 ACE Award – Best Supporting Actress (Colleen Dewhurst), 1990
 Emmy Nomination – Best Supporting Actress (Colleen Dewhurst), 1990
 Frankfurt Film Festival – Nominated, 1990
 38th Annual Columbus Film Festival – Honourable Mention – Art & Culture Category, 1990
 International Film & Television Festival of New York – Family Special – Finalist Certificate, 1990

References

External links
 

1990 films
1990 television films
Canadian drama television films
English-language Canadian films
Films based on Canadian novels
Films directed by Kevin Sullivan
Films set in Prince Edward Island
CBC Television original films
1990s Canadian films